Nathan Turner Sprague (June 22, 1828 - May 23, 1903) was a businessman, banker and Republican state legislator from Brandon, Vermont, who for many years maintained a home in Brooklyn and had extensive business interests there. He served in the Vermont legislature representing the Brandon District and in the Vermont Senate, representing Rutland County, Vermont. He funded the Sprague Centennial Library in Brandon. He established the Sprague National Bank in Brooklyn and purchased the North Western & Florida railroad in 1889.

His father had a similar name and was also prominent including as a politician in Vermont.

He was twice a widower, marrying Minerva Hull, Melinda J. Evans, and Elizabeth Harrison.

He died May 23, 1903, in his Brooklyn home. A funeral service was held for him there, and another later in Brandon, where he was buried.

References

External links
Findagrave entry

Businesspeople from Vermont
Republican Party Vermont state senators
Republican Party members of the Vermont House of Representatives
American bank presidents
19th-century American businesspeople
19th-century American politicians
People from Brandon, Vermont